Shelflife Vol 2 is the second retrospective album & the fifth solo studio album  by Calibre. Released on May 18, 2009 (although it was scheduled to be released on 11 May 2009) by his own imprint Signature Records. The Vinyl collection brings together eight of the most sought Calibre classics showcasing why
his sound remains his own after ten years of producing and releasing drum and bass.

Another retrospective album including long lasting dubplates such as 'life' and 'why time'. Just like previous albums this won't be featuring much artists apart from vocals which will be featuring lariman and DRS.

Tracklising
Disc 1:

Disc 2:

Vinyl version (4x12"): 
A: Out The Box  
B: All The Days  
C: Harbinger  
D: Fine As Dust  
E: Lazy Rock  
F: Life 
G: Why Time 
H: Zombie Life

Notes

2009 compilation albums
Calibre (musician) albums